The Isiboro River is a river of Bolivia.

See also
List of rivers of Bolivia
Isiboro Sécure National Park and Indigenous Territory

References
Rand McNally, The New International Atlas, 1993.

Rivers of Beni Department
Rivers of Cochabamba Department